Dave Ketchum may refer to:
Dave "Thumper" Ketchum, drummer for Coney Hatch
David Ketchum (actor) (born 1928), in Get Smart and Camp Runamuck